Konstanty Ludwik Plater (1722 – 31 March 1778 in Krāslava), was Castellan of Troki from 1770, voivode of Mstislavl from 1758 to 1770, Castellan of Polotsk from 1754 to 1758, the great Lithuanian Magnus Scriptor from 1746 to 1754, Maréchal of the Lithuanian Tribunal in 1754, and Starosta of Livonia and Dyneburg. In 1754, he was awarded with the Order of White Eagle, Knight of the Order of Saint Stanislaus, and the Russian Order of St. Alexander Nevsky. Married to Countess Augustina Oginska on 16 Aug 1744.

References

1722 births
1778 deaths
Castellans
People from Livonia
18th-century Polish–Lithuanian Commonwealth people
Secular senators of the Polish–Lithuanian Commonwealth